The Social Democratic Party of Georgia, also known as the Georgian Menshevik Party, was a Georgian Marxist and social democratic political party. It was founded in the 1890s by Nikolay Chkheidze, Silibistro Jibladze, Egnate Ninoshvili, Noe Zhordania and others. It became the Georgian branch of the Russian Social Democratic Labour Party. After 1905, Georgian social democrats joined the Menshevik faction, except for some such as Joseph Stalin, Grigol Ordzhonikidze and Makharadze. Several leaders were elected to the Russian Duma from Kutais or Tifli: Nikolay Chkheidze, Akaki Chkhenkeli, Evgeni Gegechkori, Isidore Ramishvili, Irakly Tsereteli, and Noe Zhordania.

The party was prior to 1917 "ambivalent" on Georgia's independence from Russia, for which it has been criticized by some Georgians as "unpatriotic and anti-national". Natalie Sabanadze describes them as "unique in their non-nationalist approach to national liberation." She argues that "they led a highly successful national movement while maintaining a degree of hostility towards nationalism and avoiding the use of nationalist rhetoric and ideology." The party became a "vehicle for Georgian nationalism" following the Russian Revolution. It governed the Democratic Republic of Georgia from 1918 to 1921. At parliamentary elections on February 14, 1919 it garnered 81.5% of the votes. Noe Zhordania became Prime Minister. In the words of Ronald Grigor Suny, "Their achievement in building a Georgian political nation was extraordinary. Their support among all classes of the Georgian people was genuine. And however ephemeral their accomplishments in the brief episode of national independence, the most impressive testimony to their successes is the fact that they could not be dislodged from Georgia except by a militarily superior force from outside."

In March 1921, the Georgian government was overthrown by the Red Army invasion. The party was liquidated in Georgia during the Soviet repressions predating to the failed anti-Soviet August Uprising in 1924. From 1921 onwards, the party began operating in exile, particularly in France, Germany (until 1933) and the United States. A Foreign Bureau was set up as the new leading organ of the party. The party was a member of the Labour and Socialist International between 1923 and 1940.

Notable members

Razhden Arsenidze
Nikolay Chkheidze
Akaki Chkhenkeli
Benia Chkhikvishvili
Seit Devdariani
Vladimir Darchiashvili
Evgeni Gegechkori
Grigol Giorgadze
Ivane Gomarteli
Evgen Gvaladze
Ioseb Iremashvili
Valiko Jugheli
Noe Khomeriki
Grigol Lordkipanidze
Vlasa Mgeladze
Isidore Ramishvili
Noe Ramishvili
Victor Tevzaia
Irakli Tsereteli
Grigol Uratadze
Noe Zhordania
Huseyngulu Mammadov

See also
Government of the Democratic Republic of Georgia in Exile

References

Stephen F. Jones, Socialism in Georgian Colors: The European Road to Social Democracy, 1883-1917, 

1890s establishments in Georgia (country)
1920s disestablishments in Georgia (country)
Defunct political parties in Georgia (country)
Democratic Republic of Georgia
Members of the Labour and Socialist International
Mensheviks
Political parties of the Russian Revolution
Pro-independence parties in the Soviet Union
Russian Social Democratic Labour Party
Social democratic parties in the Soviet Union
 02
Socialist parties in Georgia (country)